Posterior compartment may refer to:
 Posterior compartment of arm
 Posterior compartment of leg
 rectum